This is a list of compositions by Franz Krommer.

Worklist by opus number

Compiled from Library of Congress records (of scores, parts or recordings. Note that some works by Krommer were published with the same Op. number.) also from WorldCat.

Op. 1 – three string quartets (Offenbach s. M., André, about 1780)
Op. 2 – three duos for two violins (in E, C and F) (1793?)
Op. 3 – three quartets for strings (in C, A and D) (published around 1794 by André)
Op. 4 – three quartets for strings (published in 1794 by André)
Op. 5 – three quartets for strings (in E, F and B)
Op. 6 – three duos for two violins (published by Pleyel about 1799)
Op. 7 – three string quartets "concertans" (published by Andre about 1797)
Op. 8 – six string quintets
Op. 9 – seven variations for violin solo
Op. 9 – also the Op. number of a set of string quartets.
Op. 10 – three string quartets
Op. 11 – Trois quintetti : pour deux violons, deux altos & violoncelle (published by Andre in or before 1798). In F major, C minor and D major.
Op. 12 – symphony no. 1 in F major (published about 1798 by Andre)
Op. 13 – Quartet for flute, violin, viola, violoncello in D major. (c. 1797)
Op. 14 – 13 variations for violin and bass
Op. 15 – sonata in C for violin and basso continuo (published by Andre in 1799)
Op. 16 – three string quartets (in E, F and C) (published Vienna: Artaria about 1800)
Op. 17 – quartet for flute and strings in F
Op. 18 – three string quartets (in D, A and E) (new edition Adliswil ; Lottstetten : Edition Albert J. Kunzelmann, c 2000)
Op. 18 – Concertino for flute, oboe, violin, horn and orchestra in C (possibly an arrangement of one of the quartets in the set also published as Op. 18. )
Op. 19 – three string quartets "concertans", in C, F and B.
Op. 20 – three string quartets, in C, F and B (composed jointly by Krommer and Barrière. Krommer composed three movements each of two of the quartets.)
Op. 21 – quartets for clarinet and strings (no. 1 in B, no. 2 in E) (published by Andre in 1819.)
Op. 22 – three duos concertants for violins (in A major, C, and F minor)
Op. 23 – String quartet in G major (published by Simrock in Bonn in 1802)
Op. 23 – Flute quartet in C (arrangement of above?)
Op. 24 – three string quartets (published in Vienna)
Op. 25 – six quintets for two violins, two violas and bass (nos. 1-3 in C, F and E)
Op. 26 – string quartets (in C, F and A) (published by Simrock about 1801/2) 
Op. 27 – sonata for violin "with the accompaniment of a viola" in D
Op. 29 – sonata for violin with the accompaniment of a viola in D
Op. 30 – flute concerto no. 1 in G (2004 edition for flute and piano published Frankfurt (Main) : Zimmermann)
Op. 30 also – quartet for flute, violin, viola and bass in C (published by Artaria in the 1810s)
Op. 31 – Marches for woodwinds, two horns and trumpet.
Op. 32 – Trio for piano, viola, and cello, in F
Op. 33 – three duos for two violins, in B, E and A (published by Andre about 1803)
Op. 34 – three string quartets (in G major, D minor and B major) 
Op. 34 (also) – "sonata" for piano, viola and cello in F 
Op. 35 – concerto for two clarinets in E
Op. 35 – three violin duets.
Op. 36 – clarinet concerto in E (published by Offenbach s.m., André about 1803)
Op. 37 – oboe concerto in F
Op. 38 – "Concertino pour flute, hautbois et violon"
Op. 39 – concertino for flute, oboe violin and orchestra in G
Op. 40 – symphony no. 2 in D major
Op. 42 – sonata for violin with the accompaniment of a viola
Op. 43 – fourth violin concerto
Op. 44 – fifth concerto for violin and orchestra in D (exists in flute concerto arrangement also published in 1830)
Op. 45 – sonata for violin and cello in C (Canadian National Library) (See above)
Op. 45 number 1 – Partitas, woodwinds, horns (2), trumpet in B major.
Op. 45 number 2 – Harmony (Partita) for 2 oboes, 2 clarinets, 2 horns, trumpet, 2 bassoons, and contrabassoon, in E major.
 Op. 45 number 3 – Harmony (Partita) in B major for 2 oboes, 2 clarinets, trumpet, 2 horns, 2 bassoons, and contrabassoon (all three Op. 45 re-published by Döblinger in 1999.)
Op. 46 number 1 – Quartet in B for bassoon, two violas and cello.
Op. 46 number 2 – Quartet in E for bassoon, two violas and cello.
Op. 47 – thirteen pieces for two clarinets and viola (or three clarinets)
Op. 48 – string quartets (in E, C and D)
Op. 49 – quintet in D for flute, violin, two violas, and cello (published by Bureau d'Arts et d'Industrie, Vienna, 1800s) (in the NKC library in the Czech republic. Recorded on the label Edit, 1996.)
Op. 50 – string quartets in F major, B and A (the manuscript of no. 3 in A major is in the Pierpont Morgan Library)
Op. 51 – duets for violins (c. 1809) (Canadian National Library)
Op. 52 – oboe concerto in F
Op. 52 – clarinet concerto
Op. 53 – three string quartets, in E, A and C (early publication 1804. Vienna: Cappi)
Op. 54 – duos for two violins
Op. 54 – also the Op. number of three string quartets, in F, D and B (published in 1805)
Op. 55 – quintet (2nd flute quintet) for flute, violin, 2 violas and cello in E minor (possibly written 1797 )
Op. 56 – three string quartets, in B, D and G
Op. 57 – harmony (octet-partita) for winds in F
Op. 58 – quintet (3rd flute quintet) in C for flute, violin, two violas, and cello
Op. 59 – variations (quartet in G) on a Bohemian folksong for flute, violin, viola and cello
Op. 61 – violin concerto in D minor.
Op. 62 – symphony no. 3 in D major (1807) (about to be republished, 2006, by Ries & Erler. The old André edition is at the Library of Congress – Grande sinfonie pour 2 violons, flûte, 2 haut-bois, 2 clarinettes, 2 bassons, 2 cors, 2 trompettes, timbales, alto & basse...)
Op. 63 – quintet in C for flute and strings (flute, violin, two violas, and cello) (published by Sieber in Paris, between 1799 and 1813, republished in 2000.)
Op. 64 – three string quartets (published by Pleyel 1803 or 1804)
Op. 65 – concertino for flute, oboe and orchestra in C
Op. 66 – quintet in E for flute (or violin), violin, two violas, and cello (c. 1809) (Vienna: magasin de l'imprimerie chimique)
Op. 67 – octet-partita in B
Op. 68 – three string quartets in F minor, C major and A (about 1809) (Vienna: magasin de l'imprimerie chimique)
Op. 69 – "harmonie" (for wind-ensemble) for 2 oboes, 2 clarinets, 2 bassoons, horn and contrabassoon in E
Op. 69 – also the Op. no. of a quartet for clarinet, violin, viola and cello in E (written about 1808) (published in Bonn: Simrock, also about 1808)
Op. 70 – sinfonia concertante for violin, flute, clarinet and orchestra in E
Op. 70 also – string quintet in E (2 violins, 2 violas, cello)
Op. 71 – partita for winds in E
Op. 72 – string quartets in C, E and A (published c. 1810) (Vienna: magasin de l'imprimerie chimique) (nos. 1 in C and 3 in A published by Theo Wyatt in their Merton Music series in 1996.)
Op. 73 – partita for winds in F
Op. 74 – three string quartets in B, G and in D minor (published c. 1810) (Vienna: magasin de l'imprimerie chimique)
Op. 75 – quartet for flute, violin, viola and cello in D
Op. 76 – partita for winds in C
Op. 77 – partita for winds in F
Op. 78 – partita for winds in B
Op. 79 – octet-partita/nonet for 2 oboes, 2 clarinets, 2 horns, 2 bassoons, and contrabassoon in E
Op. 80 – sinfonia concertante for flute, clarinet violin and orchestra in D
Op. 80 may also be the proper Op. number of the quartets presently listed under Op. 90.
Op. 80 also is the number assigned to a string quintet
Op. 81 – violin concerto
Op. 82 – quartet for clarinet, violin, viola and cello in D. (published by Andre possibly around 1814.)
Op. 83 – harmonie for winds in F
Op. 83 – quartet for clarinet and strings in B (published by Andre around 1816.)
Op. 84 – piano trio no. 1 for piano, violin and cello in E major (Vienna: magasin de l'imprimerie chimique, around 1810) 
Op. 85 – three string quartets in F, B and D (Netherlands Library record gives 1809 for date of publication. No. 1 in F has been republished in the Merton Music series.)
Op. 86 – concerto for flute and orchestra in E minor (arranged by Joseph Küffner into a clarinet concerto)
Op. 87 – piano trio no. 2 for piano, violin and cello in F major (Vienna: Steiner. Published in 1811)
Op. 88 – three (?) quintets for strings (published c. 1810) (Vienna: magasin de l'imprimerie chimique) (number 1 is in E, number 2 is in D minor, no. 3 is in C)
Op. 89 – Grand quatuor pour flute, violin, alto, violoncello in F (Offenbach : Chez J. Andre, 1816?) 
Op. 90 – quartet for clarinet and strings in C major (1820) 
Op. 90 – also the Op. number of three string quartets, in E, C and B (c. 1813) (Vienna: magasin de l'imprimerie chimique) 
Op. 91 – quintet for flute and strings in D major
Op. 91 also – concerto in E for two clarinets and orchestra
Op. 92 – quartet for flute and strings in G (also National Library of Canada)
Op. 92 – also string quartets (date of publication 1816) (other catalog entries at the same site list the three Op. 92 quartets as being in D, B and G major respectively. Published by Ricordi in Milan.)
Op. 92 – (also Op. 94?) also a quintet for flute and strings in D minor (published by Haslinger around 1820)
Op. 93 – quartet for flute and strings in D (published by André in 1819)
Op. 94 – quartet in C for flute and strings
Op. 94 – also Duets for violins (Canadian National Library)
Op. 95 – quartet for piano and strings in E (published 1817)
Op. 95 – also quintet for clarinet, violin, two violas, and cello in B major (1817)
Op. 96 – divertimento for string trio in F, 1818. (recorded in 1999)
Op. 96 – also used for a quartet for flute and strings in C, published by André around 1819
Op. 97 – quartet for flute, violin, viola and violoncello in D (Offenbach s/M, Andre, about 1800?)
Op. 98 – quartet for flute and string trio in G
Op. 99 – three string quartets, in D major, B minor and G major 
Op. 100 – string quintets in B major, D minor, G (pub. c. 1820)
Op. 101 – quintet (no. 6) for flute and strings (published by Haslinger around 1790)
Op. 102 – symphony no. 4. 
Op. 103 – three string quartets, in G major, C major and A minor (Vienna: Steiner around 1821)
Op. 104 – Flute quintet "number 7", flute, violin, violas, violoncello in E major. (published by Steiner in Vienna.)
Op. 105 – symphony no. 5 in E (published 1815 by Andre in Offenbach on Mayn)
Op. 106 – three string quintets, in F, E and C
Op. 107 – three string quintets (2 violins, 2 violas, violoncello) (in C, A and E) (Offenbach s/M, Andre, about 1825)
Op. 108 – Mass in C for four solo singers, two violins, violas, flute, oboes, 2 clarinets, 2 bassoons, 2 horns, 2 trumpets, drums, cello, contraltos and organ. (published in 1824) 
Op. 109 – quintet no. 8 in G for flute, violin, 2 violas and cello (published in the 1820s. Wien, Tobias Haslinger)
Op. 110 – Three duets for violins (in A minor, E major and C major)
without opus number: 
partita in C minor for 2 clarinets, 2 horns and 2 bassoons
often referred to as "Ben 338" : trio in F for two oboes and English horn, variations on a theme by Pleyel
violin concerto in F (edited from a ms. in the Archiepiscopal Archive in Kroměříž, according to the Kunzelmann edition.)
Mass in D (published Firenze : Presso Ferdinando Lorenzi, 1842)
A string trio in D major published in 1993 (by Metronome Edition, Prague)
symphony 6 in D
symphony 7 in G minor
symphony 8 (lost)
symphony 9 in C

"Ben" refers to the cataloging work done on Ignaz Pleyel and Krommer's work by Rita Benton.

Complete worklist
List compiled by Karel Padrta.

Symphonies
 P I:1 – Symphony No. 1 in F major, Op. 12
 P I:2 – Symphony No. 2 in D major, Op. 40 (1803)
 P I:3 – Symphony No. 3 in D major, Op. 62
 P I:4 – Symphony No. 4 in C minor, Op. 102 (1819–20)
 P I:5 – Symphony No. 5 in E flat major, Op. 105 (1821)
 P I:6 – Symphony No. 6 in D major (1823)
 P I:7 – Symphony No. 7 in G minor (1824)
 P I:8 – Symphony No. 8 (unknown)
 P I:9 – Symphony No. 9 in C major (1830)
 P I:C1 – Sinfonia Pastorallis in C major
 P I:D1 – Symphony in D major
 P I:D2 – Sinfonia Pastorallis in D major (lost)

Concertos
 P II:1 – Concertino Op. 18 for flute, oboe & violin in C major
 P II:2 – Concertino Op. 38 for flute, oboe & violin in F major
 P II:3 – Concertino Op. 39 for flute, oboe & violin in G major
 P II:4 – Concertino Op. 65 for flute & oboe in C major
 P II:5 – Concertino Op. 70 for flute, clarinet & violin in E flat major
 P II:6 – Concertino Op. 80 for flute, clarinet & violin in D major
 P III: 1 – Violin Concerto Op. 20 in A major
 P III: 2 – Flute Concerto Op. 30 in G major
 P III: 3 – Concerto for 2 clarinets Op. 35 in E flat major
 P III: 4 – Clarinet Concerto Op. 36 in E flat major
 P III: 5 – Oboe Concerto Op. 37 in F major
 P III: 6 – Violin Concerto Op. 41 in B flat major
 P III: 7 – Violin Concerto Op. 42 in E major
 P III: 8 – Violin Concerto Op. 43 in F major
 P III: 9 – Violin Concerto Op. 44 in D major
 P III:10 – Flute Concerto Op. 44 in D major
 P III:11 – Oboe Concerto Op. 52 in F major
 P III:12 – Clarinet Concerto Op. 52 in E flat major
 P III:13 – Violin Concerto Op. 61 in D minor
 P III:14 – Violin Concerto Op. 64 in D major
 P III:15 – Violin Concerto Op. 81 in E minor
 P III:16 – Flute Concerto Op. 86 in E minor
 P III:17 – Clarinet Concerto Op. 86 in E minor
 P III:18 – Concerto for 2 clarinets Op. 91 in E flat major
 P III:C1 – Violin Concerto in C major
 P III:d1 – Flute Concerto in D minor
 P III:Es1 – Clarinet Concertino in E flat major
 P III:F1 – Violin Concerto in F major
 P III:F2 – Violin Concerto in F major
 P III:G1 – Violin Concerto in G major

Compositions for wind ensemble
 P IV: 1 – Partita Op. 45 No. 1 in B flat major
 P IV: 2 – Partita Op. 45 No. 2 in E flat major
 P IV: 3 – Partita Op. 45 No. 3 in B flat major
 P IV: 4 – Partita Op. 57 in F major
 P IV: 5 – Partita Op. 67 in B flat major
 P IV: 6 – Partita Op. 69 in E flat major
 P IV: 7 – Partita Op. 71 in E flat major
 P IV: 8 – Partita Op. 73 in F major
 P IV: 9 – Partita Op. 76 in C major
 P IV:10 – Partita Op. 77 in F major
 P IV:11 – Partita Op. 78 in B flat major
 P IV:12 – Partita Op. 79 in E flat major
 P IV:13 – Partita Op. 83 in F major
 P IV:14 – Partita in C minor
 P IV:15 – Partita in E flat major "La Chasse"
 P IV:16 – Serenade No. 7 in E flat major
 P IV:17 – Serenade No. 3 in E flat major
 P IV:18 – Partita in E flat major (P IV:18)
 P IV:19 – Partita in E flat major (P IV:19)
 P IV:20 – Serenade No. 1 in E flat major
 P IV:21 – Parthia No. 2 in E flat major
 P IV:22 – Partita in E flat major (P IV:22)
 P IV:23 – Partita in E flat major (P IV:23)
 P IV:24 – Partita in E flat major (P IV:24)
 P IV:25 – Serenade No. 5 in E flat major
 P IV:26 – Serenade No. 6 in E flat major
 P IV:27 – Partita in E flat major (P IV:27)
 P IV:28 – Variations for wind sextet in E flat major
 P IV:29 – Symphony for winds in F major
 P IV:30 – Partita in B flat major (P IV:30)
 P IV:31 – Partita in B flat major (P IV:31)
 P IV:32 – Partita in B flat major (P IV:32)
 P IV:33 – Serenade No. 4 in B flat major
 P IV:34 – Parthia No. 1 in B flat major
 P IV:35 – Parthia No. 3 in B flat major
 P IV:36 – Parthia No. 4 in B flat major
 P IV:37 – Parthia No. 5 in B flat major
 P IV:38 – Parthia No. 6 in B flat major
 P IV:39 – Parthia No. 8 in B flat major
 P IV:40 – Parthia No. 7 in B flat major
 P IV:41 – Partita in B flat major (P IV:41)
 P IV:42 – Partita in B flat major (P IV:42)
 P IV:43 – Partita in B flat major (P IV:43)
 P IV:44 – Serenade No. 8 in B flat major
 P IV:Es1 – Partita in E flat major "Corni soli"
 P IV:Es2 – Sestetto pastorale in E flat major
 P IV:Es3 – Serenade II in E flat major
 P IV:Es4 – Serenade III in E flat major
 P IV:Es5 – Serenade IV in E flat major
 P IV:Es6 – Partita in E flat major (P IV:Es6)
 P IV:F1 – Partita in F major

Marches & Dances
 P V: 1 – Marches Op. 31
 P V: 2 – Marches Op. 60
 P V: 3 – March Op. 82 (lost)
 P V: 4 – Marches Op. 97 (lost)
 P V: 5 – Marches Op. 98
 P V: 6 – Marches Op. 99 (lost)
 P V: 7 – March Op. 100 in F major
 P V: 8 – Marches (P V: 8)
 P V: 9 – March "Gott erhalte Franz der Kaiser" in E flat major
 P V:10 – Marches (P V:10)
 P V:B1 – Ländler for winds
 P V:C1 – Marches (P V:C1)

String Quintets
 P VI: 1 – String Quintet Op. 8 No. 1 in B flat major
 P VI: 2 – String Quintet Op. 8 No. 2 in E flat major
 P VI: 3 – String Quintet Op. 8 No. 3 in G major
 P VI: 4 – String Quintet Op. 11 No. 1 in F major
 P VI: 5 – String Quintet Op. 11 No. 2 in C minor
 P VI: 6 – String Quintet Op. 11 No. 3 in D major
 P VI: 7 – String Quintet Op. 18 in C major
 P VI: 8 – String Quintet Op. 25 No. 1 in C major
 P VI: 9 – String Quintet Op. 25 No. 2 in F major
 P VI:10 – String Quintet Op. 25 No. 3 in E flat major
 P VI:11 – String Quintet Op. 25 No. 4 in A major
 P VI:12 – String Quintet Op. 25 No. 5 in F minor
 P VI:13 – String Quintet Op. 25 No. 6 in B flat major
 P VI:14 – String Quintet Op. 62 in D major
 P VI:15 – String Quintet Op. 70 in E flat major
 P VI:16 – String Quintet Op. 80 in D major
 P VI:17 – String Quintet Op. 88 No. 1 in E flat major
 P VI:18 – String Quintet Op. 88 No. 2 in D minor
 P VI:19 – String Quintet Op. 88 No. 3 in C major
 P VI:20 – String Quintet Op. 100 No. 1 in B flat major
 P VI:21 – String Quintet Op. 100 No. 2 in D minor
 P VI:22 – String Quintet Op. 100 No. 3 in G major
 P VI:23 – String Quintet Op. 102 in C minor
 P VI:24 – String Quintet Op. 106 No. 1 in F major
 P VI:25 – String Quintet Op. 106 No. 2 in E flat major
 P VI:26 – String Quintet Op. 106 No. 3 in C major
 P VI:27 – String Quintet Op. 107 No. 1 in C major
 P VI:28 – String Quintet Op. 107 No. 2 in A major
 P VI:29 – String Quintet Op. 107 No. 3 in E flat major
 P VI:30 – String Quintet in D major "La Chasse"
 P VI:31 – String Quintet in E flat major (P VI:31)
 P VI:32 – String Quintet in E flat major (P VI:32)
 P VI:33 – String Quintet in E flat major (P VI:33)
 P VI:34 – String Quintet in G major
 P VI:35 – String Quintet in B flat major

Quintets with a wind instrument
 P VII: 1 – Flute Quintet Op. 25 in C major
 P VII: 2 – Flute Quintet Op. 49 in D major
 P VII: 3 – Flute Quintet Op. 55 in E minor
 P VII: 4 – Flute Quintet Op. 58 in C major
 P VII: 5 – Flute Quintet Op. 63 in C major
 P VII: 6 – Flute Quintet Op. 66 in E flat major
 P VII: 7 – Flute Quintet Op. 92 in D minor
 P VII: 8 – Clarinet Quintet Op. 95 in B flat major
 P VII: 9 – Flute Quintet Op. 101 in G major
 P VII:10 – Flute Quintet Op. 104 in E flat major
 P VII:11 – Flute Quintet Op. 109 in G major
 P VII:12 – Oboe Quintet in C major
 P VII:13 – Oboe Quintet in E flat major
 P VII:14 – Flute Quintet in G major
 P VII:15 – Oboe Quintet in E flat major (Rosinack)
 P VII:16 – Oboe Quintet in B flat major (Rosinack)
 P VII:17 – Alla polacca for flute quintet in F major

String Quartets
 P VIII: 1 – String Quartet Op. 1 No. 1 in B flat major
 P VIII: 2 – String Quartet Op. 1 No. 2 in G major
 P VIII: 3 – String Quartet Op. 1 No. 3 in E flat major
 P VIII: 4 – String Quartet Op. 3 No. 1 in C major
 P VIII: 5 – String Quartet Op. 3 No. 2 in A major
 P VIII: 6 – String Quartet Op. 3 No. 3 in D major
 P VIII: 7 – String Quartet Op. 4 No. 1 in G major
 P VIII: 8 – String Quartet Op. 4 No. 2 in E flat major
 P VIII: 9 – String Quartet Op. 4 No. 3 in B flat major
 P VIII:10 – String Quartet Op. 5 No. 1 in E flat major
 P VIII:11 – String Quartet Op. 5 No. 2 in F major
 P VIII:12 – String Quartet Op. 5 No. 3 in B flat major
 P VIII:13 – String Quartet Op. 7 No. 1 in C major
 P VIII:14 – String Quartet Op. 7 No. 2 in E minor
 P VIII:15 – String Quartet Op. 7 No. 3 in A major
 P VIII:16 – String Quartet Op. 10 No. 1 in F major
 P VIII:17 – String Quartet Op. 10 No. 2 in B flat major
 P VIII:18 – String Quartet Op. 10 No. 3 in G major
 P VIII:19 – String Quartet Op. 16 No. 1 in E flat major
 P VIII:20 – String Quartet Op. 16 No. 2 in F major
 P VIII:21 – String Quartet Op. 16 No. 3 in C major
 P VIII:22 – String Quartet Op. 18 No. 1 in D major
 P VIII:23 – String Quartet Op. 18 No. 2 in A major
 P VIII:24 – String Quartet Op. 18 No. 3 in E flat major
 P VIII:25 – String Quartet Op. 19 No. 1 in C major
 P VIII:26 – String Quartet Op. 19 No. 2 in F major
 P VIII:27 – String Quartet Op. 19 No. 3 in B flat major
 P VIII:28 – String Quartet Op. 21 in E flat major
 P VIII:29 – String Quartet Op. 23 in G major
 P VIII:30 – String Quartet Op. 24 No. 1 in D major
 P VIII:31 – String Quartet Op. 24 No. 2 in E flat major
 P VIII:32 – String Quartet Op. 24 No. 3 in G minor
 P VIII:33 – String Quartet Op. 26 No. 1 in C major
 P VIII:34 – String Quartet Op. 26 No. 2 in F major
 P VIII:35 – String Quartet Op. 26 No. 3 in A major
 P VIII:36 – String Quartet Op. 34 No. 1 in G major
 P VIII:37 – String Quartet Op. 34 No. 2 in D minor
 P VIII:38 – String Quartet Op. 34 No. 3 in B flat major
 P VIII:39 – String Quartet Op. 48 No. 1 in E flat major
 P VIII:40 – String Quartet Op. 48 No. 2 in C major
 P VIII:41 – String Quartet Op. 48 No. 3 in D major
 P VIII:42 – String Quartet Op. 50 No. 1 in F major
 P VIII:43 – String Quartet Op. 50 No. 2 in B flat major
 P VIII:44 – String Quartet Op. 50 No. 3 in A major
 P VIII:45 – String Quartet Op. 53 No. 1 in E flat major
 P VIII:46 – String Quartet Op. 53 No. 2 in A major
 P VIII:47 – String Quartet Op. 53 No. 3 in C major
 P VIII:48 – String Quartet Op. 54 No. 1 in F major
 P VIII:49 – String Quartet Op. 54 No. 2 in D major
 P VIII:50 – String Quartet Op. 54 No. 3 in B flat major
 P VIII:51 – String Quartet Op. 56 No. 1 in B flat major
 P VIII:52 – String Quartet Op. 56 No. 2 in D major
 P VIII:53 – String Quartet Op. 56 No. 3 in G major
 P VIII:54 – String Quartet Op. 68 No. 1 in F minor
 P VIII:55 – String Quartet Op. 68 No. 2 in C major
 P VIII:56 – String Quartet Op. 68 No. 3 in A major
 P VIII:57 – String Quartet Op. 72 No. 1 in C major
 P VIII:58 – String Quartet Op. 72 No. 2 in E major
 P VIII:59 – String Quartet Op. 72 No. 3 in A flat major
 P VIII:60 – String Quartet Op. 74 No. 1 in B flat major
 P VIII:61 – String Quartet Op. 74 No. 2 in G major
 P VIII:62 – String Quartet Op. 74 No. 3 in D minor
 P VIII:63 – String Quartet Op. 85 No. 1 in F major
 P VIII:64 – String Quartet Op. 85 No. 2 in B flat major
 P VIII:65 – String Quartet Op. 85 No. 3 in D major
 P VIII:66 – 3 Hungarian Dances Op. 89
 P VIII:67 – String Quartet Op. 90 No. 1 in E flat major
 P VIII:68 – String Quartet Op. 90 No. 2 in C major
 P VIII:69 – String Quartet Op. 90 No. 3 in B flat major
 P VIII:70 – String Quartet Op. 92 No. 1 in D major
 P VIII:71 – String Quartet Op. 92 No. 2 in B flat major
 P VIII:72 – String Quartet Op. 92 No. 3 in G major
 P VIII:73 – String Quartet op103 No. 1 in E minor
 P VIII:74 – String Quartet op103 No. 2 in C major
 P VIII:75 – String Quartet op103 No. 3 in A minor
 P VIII:76 – 12 Walzes for String Quartet
 P VIII:77 – Allegretto for string quartet in A major
 P VIII:78 – String Quartet in C major
 P VIII:F1 – String Quartet in F major

Quartets with a wind/keyboard instrument
 P IX: 1 – Flute Quartet Op. 13 in D major
 P IX: 2 – Flute Quartet Op. 17 in F major
 P IX: 3 – Clarinet Quartet Op. 21 No. 2 in E flat major
 P IX: 4 – Clarinet Quartet Op. 21 No. 1 in B flat major
 P IX: 5 – Clarinet Quartet Op. 69 in E flat major
 P IX: 6 – Flute Quartet Op. 23 in G major
 P IX: 7 – Flute Quartet Op. 30 in C major
 P IX: 8 – Bassoon Quartet Op. 46 No. 1 in B flat major
 P IX: 9 – Bassoon Quartet Op. 46 No. 2 in E flat major
 P IX:10 – Variations for flute quartet on "O, du lieber Augustin" Op. 59 in D major
 P IX:11 – Flute Quartet Op. 75 in D major
 P IX:12 – Clarinet Quartet Op. 82 in D major
 P IX:13 – Clarinet Quartet Op. 83 in B flat major
 P IX:14 – Flute Quartet Op. 89 in F major
 P IX:15 – Flute Quartet Op. 90 in C major
 P IX:16 – Flute Quartet Op. 92 in G major
 P IX:17 – Flute Quartet Op. 93 in D major
 P IX:18 – Flute Quartet Op. 94 in C major
 P IX:19 – Flute Quartet Op. 97 in D major
 P IX:20 – Flute Quartet in C major
 P IX:21 – Oboe Quartet in C major
 P IX:22 – Oboe Quartet in F major
 P IX:B1 – Clarinet Quartet in B flat major
 P IX:D1 – Variations for flute quartet in D major
 P IX:e1 – Flute Quartet in E minor
 P X:1 – Piano Quartet Op. 95 in E flat major

Trio Sonatas
 P XI:1 – String Trio Op. 96 in F major
 P XI:D1 – Variations for string trio in D major
 P XII:1 – 13 Pieces for 2 clarinets & viola Op. 47
 P XII:2 – Sonata for 2 oboes & English horn in F major
 P XII:3 – Variations for 2 oboes & English horn in F major
 P XIII:1 – Piano Trio Op. 32 in F major
 P XIII:2 – Piano Trio Op. 84 in E flat major
 P XIII:3 – Piano Trio Op. 87 in F major

Duo Sonatas
 P XIV: 1 – Duet for violins Op. 2 No. 1 in E flat major
 P XIV: 2 – Duet for violins Op. 2 No. 2 in C major
 P XIV: 3 – Duet for violins Op. 2 No. 3 in F major
 P XIV: 4 – Duet for violins Op. 6 No. 1 in E flat major
 P XIV: 5 – Duet for violins Op. 6 No. 2 in G major
 P XIV: 6 – Duet for violins Op. 6 No. 3 in B flat major
 P XIV: 7 – Duet for violins Op. 22 No. 1 in A major
 P XIV: 8 – Duet for violins Op. 22 No. 2 in C major
 P XIV: 9 – Duet for violins Op. 22 No. 3 in F minor
 P XIV:10 – Duet for violins Op. 33 No. 1 in B flat major
 P XIV:11 – Duet for violins Op. 33 No. 2 in E major
 P XIV:12 – Duet for violins Op. 33 No. 3 in A flat major
 P XIV:13 – Duet for violins Op. 51 No. 1 in D major
 P XIV:14 – Duet for violins Op. 51 No. 2 in F major
 P XIV:15 – Duet for violins Op. 51 No. 3 in E flat major
 P XIV:16 – Duet for violins Op. 54 No. 1 in A major
 P XIV:17 – Duet for violins Op. 54 No. 2 in F major
 P XIV:18 – Duet for violins Op. 54 No. 3 in E flat major
 P XIV:19 – Duet for violins Op. 94 No. 1 in G minor
 P XIV:20 – Duet for violins Op. 94 No. 2 in C major
 P XIV:21 – Duet for violins Op. 94 No. 3 in A major
 P XIV:22 – Duet for violins op110 No. 1 in A minor
 P XIV:23 – Duet for violins op110 No. 2 in E major
 P XIV:24 – Duet for violins op110 No. 3 in C major
 P XIV:A1 – Duet for violins in A major
 P XIV:B1 – Duet for violins in B flat major (P XIV:B1)
 P XIV:B2 – Duet for violins in B flat major (P XIV:B2)
 P XIV:C1 – Duet for violins in C major
 P XIV:D1 – Duet for violins in D major (P XIV:D1)
 P XIV:D2 – Duet for violins in D major (P XIV:D2)
 P XIV:E1 – Duet for violins in E major
 P XIV:F1 – Duet for violins in F major (P XIV:F1)
 P XIV:F2 – Duet for violins in F major (P XIV:F2)
 P XIV:G1 – Duet for violins in G major
 P XV: 1 – Duet for flutes Op. 2 No. 1 in G major
 P XV: 2 – Duet for flutes Op. 2 No. 2 in D major
 P XV: 3 – Duet for flutes Op. 2 No. 3 in C major
 P XV: 4 – Duet for flutes Op. 6 No. 1 in D major
 P XV: 5 – Duet for flutes Op. 6 No. 2 in C major
 P XV: 6 – Duet for flutes Op. 6 No. 3 in G major
 P XV: 7 – Duet for flutes Op. 22 No. 1 in A major
 P XV: 8 – Duet for flutes Op. 22 No. 2 in D major
 P XV: 9 – Duet for flutes Op. 22 No. 3 in G minor
 P XV:10 – Duet for flutes Op. 33 No. 1 in D major
 P XV:11 – Duet for flutes Op. 33 No. 2 in F major
 P XV:12 – Duet for flutes Op. 33 No. 3 in B flat major
 P XV:13 – Duet for flutes Op. 51 No. 1 in D major
 P XV:14 – Duet for flutes Op. 51 No. 2 in F major
 P XV:15 – Duet for flutes Op. 51 No. 3 in C major
 P XV:16 – Duet for flutes Op. 54 No. 1 in G major
 P XV:17 – Duet for flutes Op. 54 No. 2 in D major
 P XV:18 – Duet for flutes Op. 54 No. 3 in G major
 P XV:19 – Duettino for flutes Book I No. 1 in C major
 P XV:20 – Duettino for flutes Book I No. 2 in D major
 P XV:21 – Duettino for flutes Book I No. 3 in C major
 P XV:22 – Duettino for flutes Book I No. 4 in C major
 P XV:23 – Duettino for flutes Book I No. 5 in D major
 P XV:24 – Duettino for flutes Book I No. 6 in G major
 P XV:25 – Duettino for flutes Book II No. 1 in G major
 P XV:26 – Duettino for flutes Book II No. 2 in A major
 P XV:27 – Duettino for flutes Book II No. 3 in C major
 P XV:28 – Duettino for flutes Book II No. 4 in G major
 P XV:29 – Duettino for flutes Book II No. 5 in G major
 P XV:30 – Duettino for flutes Book II No. 6 in A major

Violin Sonatas
 P XVI:1 – Variations for violin & bass Op. 9 in E flat major
 P XVI:2 – Variations for violin & bass Op. 14 in B flat major
 P XVI:3 – Violin Sonata Op. 15 in C major
 P XVI:4 – Sonata for violin & viola Op. 27 in D major
 P XVI:5 – Sonata for violin & viola Op. 29 in A major
 P XVI:6 – Variations for violin Op. 41 (lost)
 P XVI:7 – Sonata for violin & viola Op. 45 (lost)
 P XVI:B1 – Variations for violin & bass in B flat major
 P XVI:C1 – Variations for violin in C major

Keyboard Works
 P XVII: 1 – Sonatina for piano & violin Book I No. 1 in G major
 P XVII: 2 – Sonatina for piano & violin Book I No. 2 in B flat major
 P XVII: 3 – Sonatina for piano & violin Book I No. 3 in C major
 P XVII: 4 – Sonatina for piano & violin Book I No. 4 in D minor
 P XVII: 5 – Sonatina for piano & violin Book I No. 5 in E flat major
 P XVII: 6 – Sonatina for piano & violin Book I No. 6 in A flat major
 P XVII: 7 – Sonatina for piano & violin Book II No. 1 in G minor
 P XVII: 8 – Sonatina for piano & violin Book II No. 2 in C major
 P XVII: 9 – Sonatina for piano & violin Book II No. 3 in D major
 P XVII:10 – Sonatina for piano & violin Book II No. 4 in E flat major
 P XVII:11 – Sonatina for piano & violin Book II No. 5 in E flat major
 P XVII:12 – Sonatina for piano & violin Book II No. 6 in B flat major
 P XVII:13 – Sonatina for piano & violin Book III No. 1 in F major
 P XVII:14 – Sonatina for piano & violin Book III No. 2 in A major
 P XVII:15 – Sonatina for piano & violin Book III No. 3 in C major
 P XVII:16 – Sonatina for piano & violin Book III No. 4 in B flat major
 P XVII:17 – Sonatina for piano & violin Book III No. 5 in G major
 P XVII:18 – Sonatina for piano & violin Book III No. 6 in D major
 P XVII:19 – Polonaise favorite for piano & violin in F major
 P XVIII: 1 – Marches for piano Op. 31
 P XVIII: 2 – 6 Waltzes for piano Op. 94
 P XVIII: 3 – Bürgermarsch for piano (lost)
 P XVIII: 4 – Marches for piano
 P XVIII: 5 – Sonata for piano 4 hands in C major
 P XVIII: 6 – Sonata for piano 4 hands in G major
 P XVIII: 7 – Sonata for piano 4 hands in D major
 P XVIII: 8 – 2 Märsche der Niederösterreichischen Landeswehr for piano (lost)
 P XVIII: 9 – Polonaise favorite de Varsovie for piano in G major
 P XVIII:10 – Polonaise favorite for piano in F major
 P XVIII:11 – Symphony Op. 40 for piano 4 hands in D major
 P XVIII:12 – Trauermarsch for piano in B flat minor
 P XVIII:13 – Menuet for piano in C major
 P XVIII:14 – Menuet for piano in F major
 P XVIII:15 – Rondo for piano in E flat major
 P XVIII:16 – Menuet for piano in D major
 P XVIII:17 – Hungarian dance for piano in F minor
 P XVIII:18 – Andante for piano 4 hands in C major
 P XVIII:19 – 12 German dances for harpsichord
 P XVIII:20 – Quartet for harpsichord duet in C major
 P XVIII:21 – Quartet for harpsichord duet in E minor
 P XVIII:22 – Quartet for harpsichord duet in A major
 P XVIII:G1 – Allegro for piano 4 hands in G major

Sacred works
 P XIX:1 – Mass Op. 108 in C major
 P XIX:2 – Mass in D minor
 P XIX:3 – Mass in C major (P XIX:3)
 P XIX:4 – Mass in C major (P XIX:4)
 P XX:1 – Pange lingua in D major
 P XX:2 – Pange lingua in E major
 P XX:3 – Pange lingua in B major
 P XX:4 – Offerimus tibi in D major

References

Krommer, Franz